Rickard Nordstrand (born March 14, 1976) is a Swedish Light Heavyweight kickboxer competing in K-1.

Biography and career 
He knocked out Sem Braan in round two at Fight Night 08 in Stockholm, Sweden on August 17, 2013.

Titles and accomplishments
 2009 WMC World Light Heavyweight Champion
 2004 IFMA Amateur World Cruiserweight Champion
 1999 WKA Amateur Kickboxing World Championship 3rd Place
 Five time IFMA Swedish Muay Thai Champion
 2004 K-1 World Grand Prix Preliminary Scandinavia Finalist
 2006 K-1 Scandinavia Grand Prix in Stockholm Finalist

Film and television
Nordstrand has also worked with film productions as stunt double and fighting coordinator for the actor Mikael Persbrandt in the spy/action Hamilton film series. He will portray a warrior in the third season of the popular TV drama Game of Thrones and also has an unnamed project with Brad Pitt lined up.

Kickboxing record

|-  bgcolor="#CCFFCC"
| 2013-08-17 || Win ||align=left| Sem Braan || Fight Night 08 || Stockholm, Sweden || KO (punches) || 2 || 1:34 || 27-8-2
|-  bgcolor="#CCFFCC"
| 2010-12-11 || Win ||align=left| Jiri Zak || K-1 Scandinavia Rumble of the Kings 2010 || Stockholm, Sweden || Decision (3-0) || 3 || 3:00 || 26-8-2
|-  bgcolor="#CCFFCC"
| 2009-09-20 || Win ||align=left| Clifton Brown || K-1 Scandinavia Rumble of the Kings 2009 || Stockholm, Sweden || TKO (Referee stoppage) || 2 || || 25-8-2
|-
! style=background:white colspan=9 |
|-
|-  bgcolor="#CCFFCC"
| 2009-05-22 || Win ||align=left| Alex Dally || K-1 Scandinavia Rumble of the Kings 2009 Qualification || Malmo, Sweden || TKO || 2 || 2:43 || 24-8-2
|-  bgcolor="#ffbbbb"
| 2007-08-11 || Loss ||align=left| Patrick Barry || K-1 World GP 2007 in Las Vegas || Las Vegas, Nevada || TKO (Low kicks) || 2 || 2:16 || 23-8-2
|-  bgcolor="#ffbbbb"
| 2007-05-19 || Loss ||align=left| Ashwin Balrak || K-1 Scandinavia Grand Prix 2006 || Stockholm, Sweden || Decision (3-0) || 3 || 3:00 || 23-7-2
|-  bgcolor="#CCFFCC"
| 2007-05-19 || Win ||align=left| Goran Vidakovic || K-1 Scandinavia Grand Prix 2006 || Stockholm, Sweden || KO (Right hook) || 2 || 2:50 || 23-6-2
|-  bgcolor="#c5d2ea"
| 2006-11-24 || Draw ||align=left| Magomed Magomedov || K-1 World MAX North European Qualification 2007 || Stockholm, Sweden || Ext. R Decision (0-0) || 4 || 3:00 || 
|-  bgcolor="#ffbbbb"
| 2006-05-20 || Loss ||align=left| Magomed Magomedov || K-1 Scandinavia Grand Prix 2006 || Stockholm, Sweden || Decision (3-0) || 3 || 3:00 || 
|-  bgcolor="#CCFFCC"
| 2006-05-20 || Win ||align=left| Topi Helin || K-1 Scandinavia Grand Prix 2006 || Stockholm, Sweden || Decision (3-0) || 3 || 3:00 || 
|-  bgcolor="#CCFFCC"
| 2006-05-20 || Win ||align=left| Tsutomu Takahagi || K-1 Scandinavia Grand Prix 2006 || Stockholm, Sweden || KO || 3 || || 
|-  bgcolor="#ffbbbb"
| 2005-09-23 || Loss ||align=left| Ruslan Karaev || K-1 World Grand Prix 2005 || Osaka, Japan || Decision (3-0) || 3 || 3:00 || 
|-  bgcolor="#ffbbbb"
| 2005-07-29 || Loss ||align=left| Musashi || K-1 World Grand Prix 2005 in Hawaii || Honolulu, Hawaii || Decision (2-0) || 3 || 3:00 || 
|-  bgcolor="#ffbbbb"
| 2005-05-21 || Loss ||align=left| Remy Bonjasky || K-1 Scandinavia Grand Prix 2005 || Stockholm, Sweden || Decision (3-0) || 3 || 3:00 || 
|-  bgcolor="#CCFFCC"
| 2004-05-31 || Win ||align=left| Artur Skamkalov || IFMA Muay Thai World Championships 2004 || Bangkok, Thailand ||  ||  ||  || 
|-
! style=background:white colspan=9 |
|-
|-  bgcolor="#CCFFCC"
| 2004-05-31 || Win ||align=left|  || IFMA Muay Thai World Championships 2004 || Bangkok, Thailand ||  ||  ||  || 
|-  bgcolor="#CCFFCC"
| 2004-05-31 || Win ||align=left|  || IFMA Muay Thai World Championships 2004 || Bangkok, Thailand ||  ||  ||  || 
|-  bgcolor="#CCFFCC"
| 2004-05-31 || Win ||align=left|  || IFMA Muay Thai World Championships 2004 || Bangkok, Thailand ||  ||  ||  || 
|-  bgcolor="#ffbbbb"
| 2004-02-14 || Loss ||align=left| Brecht Wallis || K-1 Scandinavia 2004 World Qualification || Stockholm, Sweden || TKO (Corner stoppage) || 3 || 3:00 || 
|-  bgcolor="#CCFFCC"
| 2004-02-14 || Win ||align=left| Roman Kupcak || K-1 Scandinavia 2004 World Qualification || Stockholm, Sweden || Decision (3-0) || 3 || 3:00 ||
|-  bgcolor="#CCFFCC"
| 2004-02-14 || Win ||align=left| Jorgen Himmerstal || K-1 Scandinavia 2004 World Qualification || Stockholm, Sweden || TKO || 1 || 0:54 || 
|-  bgcolor="#CCFFCC"
| 2003 || Win ||align=left| Misa Baculov || || Stockholm, Sweden || Decision (3-0) || 5 || 2:00 || 
|-  bgcolor="#CCFFCC"
| 2001-06-09 || Win ||align=left| Ali Reza || K-1 Scandinavia Grand Prix 2001 || Copenhagen, Denmark || Decision (2-0) || 5 || 3:00 || 
|-
|-
| colspan=9 | Legend:

See also 
List of male kickboxers
List of K-1 Events

References

External links
Official K-1 website
Rickard Nordstrand K-1 profile

1976 births
Living people
Swedish male kickboxers
Light heavyweight kickboxers
Sportspeople from Stockholm